The 1951 Singapore Open, also known as the 1951 Singapore Badminton Championships, took place from 18 November 1951 – 24 January 1952 at the Clerical Union Hall in Balestier and the  Happy World Stadium in Kallang, Singapore. The ties were played over a few months with the first round ties being played on the 18th of November and last few matches (the men's and women's singles finals) were played on the 24th of January 1952.

Venue
Clerical Union Hall
Happy World Stadium

Final results

References 

Singapore Open (badminton)
1951 in badminton